Jared Poulton (born 21 April 1977) is a former Australian rules footballer in the Australian Football League.

Debuting with the Port Adelaide Football Club in 1999, he was noted as an impact player and when Port was playing well in 2004. Poulton cemented his spot in the side until a hamstring injury led him to miss the finals series of that year and ultimately, a premiership win.

In 2002, Poulton became the 35th player in VFL/AFL history to kick a winning goal after the siren, against the Sydney Swans.

Poulton retired in 2005 after playing just one game for the year, with 88 games to his credit.

After that he went back to the SANFL to play for the Port Adelaide Magpies alongside fellow Power teammate Byron Pickett.

External links 

Port Adelaide Football Club players
Port Adelaide Magpies players
Port Adelaide Football Club players (all competitions)
Australian rules footballers from South Australia
1977 births
Living people